Mitchell Krueger and Blaž Rola were the defending champions but lost in the first round to William Blumberg and Max Schnur.

Blumberg and Schnur won the title after defeating Treat Huey and Frederik Nielsen 3–6, 6–1, [14–12] in the final.

Seeds

Draw

References

 Main draw

Charlottesville Men's Pro Challenger - Doubles
2021 Doubles